Gerald Elliott Kenworthy Browne (14 May 1850 – 6 July 1910) was an English cricketer active in mid-1870s. Born at Goldington Hall at Goldington, Bedfordshire, Browne was a right-handed batsman.

Brown made his debut in first-class cricket for Gloucestershire against Surrey in 1874 at The Oval, with him making a second first-class appearance for the county in that season against Sussex at the County Ground, Hove. He scored 20 runs in these two matches, top-scoring with 12.

He died at Kilmacanogue, Ireland on 6 July 1910. His brother Elliott was also a first-class cricketer.

References

External links
Gerald Browne at ESPNcricinfo
Gerald Browne at CricketArchive

1850 births
1910 deaths
Sportspeople from Bedford
English cricketers
Gloucestershire cricketers
People from Goldington